Dark Command is a 1940 Western film starring Claire Trevor, John Wayne and Walter Pidgeon loosely based on Quantrill's Raiders during the American Civil War. Directed by Raoul Walsh from the novel by W. R. Burnett, Dark Command is the only film in which western icons John Wayne and Roy Rogers appear together, and was the only film Wayne and Raoul Walsh made together since Walsh discovered Wayne working as a prop mover, renamed him, and gave him his first leading role in the epic widescreen Western The Big Trail a decade before.

The film also features George "Gabby" Hayes as Wayne's character's sidekick.

The film was nominated for two Academy Awards for Best Original Score and Best Art Direction by John Victor Mackay.

Plot
Mary McCloud marries the seemingly peaceful Kansas schoolteacher William Cantrell, before finding out that he harbours a dark secret. He is actually an outlaw leader who attacks both sides in the Civil War for his own profit. After capturing a wagon loaded with Confederate uniforms, he decides to pass himself off as a Confederate officer. Her naive, idealistic brother Fletcher joins what he believes is a Rebel guerrilla force. Meanwhile, Cantrell's stern but loving mother refuses to accept any of her son's ill-gotten loot.

A former suitor of Mary's, Union supporter Bob Seton, is captured by Cantrell and scheduled for execution. After being rescued by a disillusioned Fletcher McCloud, Seton and Mary Cantrell race to the town of Lawrence (site of an actual infamous Quantrill-led massacre) to warn the residents of an impending attack by Cantrell's gang.

Cast
 Claire Trevor as Mary McCloud
 John Wayne as Bob Seton
 Walter Pidgeon as William "Will" Cantrell
 Roy Rogers as Fletcher "Fletch" McCloud
 George "Gabby" Hayes as Andrew "Doc" Grunch
 Porter Hall as Angus McCloud
 Marjorie Main as Mrs. Cantrell, aka Mrs. Adams
 Raymond Walburn as Judge Buckner
 Joe Sawyer as Bushropp (guerrilla)
 Helen MacKellar as Mrs. Hale
 J. Farrell MacDonald as Dave (gunrunner)
 Trevor Bardette as Mr. Hale

Production
W.R. Burnett's novel was published in 1938 and became a best seller. It was a rare historical novel from Burnett, who was better known for modern day crime stories. Film rights were purchased by Republic Pictures who announced the film in May 1939 as part of their slate for 1939–40.

Director Raoul Walsh had discovered John Wayne in 1929 when Wayne was a 23-year-old prop man named Marion "Duke" Morrison. Walsh was reading a biography of General "Mad Anthony" Wayne at the time and gave the prop boy the last name "Wayne" after casting him as the lead in The Big Trail (1930), a 70 mm Grandeur widescreen epic shot on location all across the West. Dark Command remains the only other film upon which both Walsh and Wayne collaborated during their lengthy careers.

The film was financed on a larger budget than Republic normally provided. It was a similar scale to a successful historical drama they had made the year before, Man of Conquest. Walter Pidgeon was borrowed from MGM. Filming started November 1939.

Dark Command was the second film John Wayne made with Claire Trevor after Stagecoach, the other being Allegheny Uprising (1939).

Roy Rogers was given a key support role in Dark Command, the only time John Wayne and Roy Rogers made a movie together.

Historical Inaccuracies
The pistols used by some of the cast are Colt single action army, SAA guns, not made until 1873. The movie is set at the outbreak of the Civil War in 1860 when cap and ball pistols were used such as the Colt 1858 Navy. John Wayne carries a Colt Peacemaker not made until 1873.

Release
Dark Command premiered in Lawrence, Kansas.

It received favourable reviews and box office, and encouraged Republic to continue to allocate more money for John Wayne films.

See also
 List of American films of 1940
 John Wayne filmography

References

External links
 
 
 
 

Films directed by Raoul Walsh
1940 films
American Civil War films
Films scored by Victor Young
Films based on American novels
Films based on works by W. R. Burnett
Films set in Kansas
Republic Pictures films
1940s English-language films
1940 Western (genre) films
Films produced by Sol C. Siegel
Films with screenplays by F. Hugh Herbert
American Western (genre) films
American black-and-white films
1940s American films